Yek Jofti (also Romanized as Yek Joftī; also known as Yek Khoftī) is a village in Gamasiyab Rural District, in the Central District of Sahneh County, Kermanshah Province, Iran. At the 2006 census, its population was 124, in 26 families.

References 

Populated places in Sahneh County